The Liberty Unification Party was a conservative political party in South Korea.

History 
The party was originally formed as the Korea Party (Proportional) by Choi In-shik, who exited from the United Korea Party (now as the New National Participation Party). It soon changed the name to Party for National Revolution (Korean: 국민혁명당) after the National Election Commission did not allow all political parties from using the term "(Proportional)" to their names.

On 29 January 2020, Kim Moon-soo, the former Governor of Gyeonggi, quitted from the Liberty Korea Party and joined this party. 2 days later, the party was officially formed and elected Kim as its President. Jeon Kwang-hoon, a pastor, did not officially join but showed his intention to be allied with the party.

Koh Young-il, the President of the Christian Liberal Party, showed his intention to form an electoral alliance with this party.

On 20 February, the party agreed to be merged with the Our Republican Party before the election.

References

External links
Official website
Liberty Unification Party on YouTube

2020 disestablishments in South Korea
2020 establishments in South Korea
Anti-communism in South Korea
Anti-communist parties
Far-right politics in South Korea
Ilminist parties
Conservative parties in South Korea
Christian political parties
Defunct conservative parties
Defunct political parties in South Korea
Political parties disestablished in 2020
Political parties established in 2020